Rune Pedersen may refer to:

Rune Pedersen (referee) (born 1963) Norwegian football referee, who officiated at the 1994 FIFA World Cup
Rune Pedersen (footballer) (born 1979) Danish football goalkeeper
Rune Pedersen (Norwegian footballer) (born 1952) who played for SK Brann